Ricardo Morales (born 1972) is a classical clarinetist of Puerto Rican descent. Since 2003, he has been the principal clarinetist of the Philadelphia Orchestra. Prior to that, he was the principal clarinetist at the Metropolitan Opera Orchestra. He currently serves on the faculty of Temple University.

In September, 2012, he launched the "Online Clarinet School with Ricardo Morales" as a part of the ArtistWorks Classical Campus.

References

External links 
 Online Clarinet School with Ricardo Morales
 Biography at the Temple University website
 Biography at the Juilliard School website.
 Biography at Leblanc's website

1972 births
American classical clarinetists
Place of birth missing (living people)
Living people
21st-century clarinetists
Musicians of the Philadelphia Orchestra